Provincial Trunk Highway 22 (PTH 22) is a short north-south provincial highway in the Canadian province of Manitoba. It runs from PTH 23 near Elgin to PTH 2 and PR 250 in Souris. This highway is the main access road to the renowned Souris Swinging Bridge.

History
Originally, Highway 22 was the designation of the route connecting the US border south of Melita to Highway 2 in Pipestone. In 1947, it extended north to Highway 1 in Virden. In 1953, the government re-designated the highway as PTH 83 in order to match U.S. Route 83. 

After the original Highway 22 was redesignated as PTH 83, it was moved to a route connecting Highway 1 near Beausejour to Grand Beach, which is now PTH 12 and PTH 59, between 1953 and 1955. The highway was extended to Victoria Beach along what is now PTH 59 in 1956. After the highway was extended, a small stretch of Highway 22 to Grand Beach was redesignated as Highway 22A.  The route kept this designation until 1959, when PTH 12 was extended north, replacing Highway 22. As well, the former section of Highway 22A was redesignated as Highway 12G. A small section of the former Highway 22 south of Victoria Beach was redesignated as Highway 12V as Highway 12 turned east to meet Highway 11 at Pine Falls.

PTH 22 was designated to its current route in 1960.

References

External links 
Manitoba Official Map - Southwest

022